Bernhard Beibl (born 26 May 1979) is a musician from Vienna, Austria. He attended the Joseph Haydn Conservatory where he studied jazz guitar with Gerald Gradwohl. He was a member of Tangerine Dream from 2006 to 2014.

References

External links
 Official website

Austrian male musicians
Tangerine Dream members
1979 births
Living people
Musicians from Vienna
21st-century Austrian musicians